Roberto Bautista Agut was the defending champion, but withdrew due to a stomach virus.

Jack Sock won the title, defeating João Sousa in the final, 6–3, 5–7, 6–3.

Seeds
The top four seeds received a bye into the second round.

Draw

Finals

Top half

Bottom half

Qualifying

Seeds

Qualifiers

Lucky loser
  Jose Statham

Qualifying draw

First qualifier

Second qualifier

Third qualifier

Fourth qualifier

References

External Links
 Main Draw
 Qualifying Draw

2017 Men's Singles
2017 ATP World Tour
2017 in New Zealand tennis